Jules Henri Barrois (3 September 1852 – 1943) was a French zoologist and head of the marine zoological laboratory (l'Observatoire Oceanologique de Villefranche) at Villefranche-sur-Mer from the early 1880s.  He was the brother of Charles Barrois (1851–1939), geologist and palaeontologist, and student of Alfred Mathieu Giard (1846–1908) at Université de Lille.

Publications 
 Mémoire sur l'embryologie des Bryozaires Mémoire sur l'embryologie des Némertes, dissertation presented to the "Faculté des sciences" in Paris, 1877 - Memoir on the embryology of bryozoans; Memoire on the embryology of nemerteans.
 Mémoire sur les membranes embryonnaires des Salpes, 1881 - Memoire on the embryonic membranes of Salpidae.
 Études complémentaires sur la métamorphose des bryozoaires, 1925 - Complementary studies on the metamorphosis of bryozoans.
 Étude sur la formation du polypide des bryozoaires, 1927 - Study on the formation of polypide in bryozoans.

References 
 PDF Bibliographie dirigée des périodiques scientifiques des stations de biologie marine entre 1872 et 1900

French zoologists
1852 births
1943 deaths
Lille University of Science and Technology alumni